Stagmatophora haploceros is a moth in the  family Cosmopterigidae. It is found in Australia, where it has been recorded from Queensland.

References

Natural History Museum Lepidoptera generic names catalog

Cosmopteriginae
Moths of Australia
Moths described in 1926